Mashel Al Naimi (born 8 September 1983 in Doha) is a Qatari motorcycle racer.

Career statistics

Superbike World Championship

Races by year

Grand Prix motorcycle racing

By season

Races by year
(key)

External links

Living people
1983 births
Qatari motorcycle racers
Moto2 World Championship riders
Superbike World Championship riders
FIM Superstock 1000 Cup riders